The Old Colony Rail Trail is a paved rail trail located in Harwich and Chatham, Massachusetts. It occupies the Old Colony Railroad's abandoned Chatham Branch railroad right-of-way. Most of the trail follows roughly the path of the old railbed, except for deviations around the Chatham Municipal Airport and a utility yard in Harwich. Its west end connects to the Cape Cod Rail Trail in Harwich at a bike rotary.

A multi-use path along George Ryder Road is planned to separate trail users from auto traffic. $323,000 in state funding for design and construction was awarded in 2022.

References

External links

Old Colony Rail Trail Map

Rail trails in Massachusetts
Parks in Barnstable County, Massachusetts
Chatham, Massachusetts
Transportation in Barnstable County, Massachusetts
Harwich, Massachusetts